Gurindam (Jawi: ڬوريندام) is a type of irregular verse forms of traditional Malay poetry. It is a combination of two clauses where the relative clause forms a line and is thus linked to the second line, or the main clause. Each pair of lines (stanza) provides complete ideas within the pair and has the same rhyme in its end. There is no limit on the number words per line and neither the rhythm per line is fixed.

Although Gurindam looks similar with Syair which also have the same rhyme at the end of each stanza, it differs in the sense that it completes the message within the same stanza while Syair unfolding the message in several stanzas. The first line of gurindam is known as syarat (protasis) and the second line is jawab (apodosis). In other words, the first line states a condition while the second line provides the answer.

One of the most well known literary works on Gurindam was the Gurindam Dua Belas (Twelve Gurindam) of Raja Ali Haji written in 1847. Below is the 5th clause of the famous 12 Gurindam:

References

Malay-language poems